The Girls' 400 metres at the 2013 World Youth Championships in Athletics was held  on 10–12 July.

Medalists

Records 
Prior to the competition, the following records were as follows.

Heats 
Qualification rule: first 3 of each heat (Q) plus the 3 fastest times (q) qualified.

Heat 1

Heat 2

Heat 3

Heat 4

Heat 5

Heat 6

Heat 7

Semifinals 
Qualification rule: first 2 of each heat (Q) plus the 2 fastest times (q) qualified.

Heat 1

Heat 2

Heat 3

Final 
The final was won by Sabrika Bakare in 52.77 seconds.

References 

2013 World Youth Championships in Athletics